Paulownia coreana, also called Paulownia glabrata or Korean paulownia, is an indigenous species of South Korea. It is cultivated in South Pyongan and south of Gyeonggi.

Description 

Foliage 
The other characteristics of the leaves are that they have opposite leaf arrangement and netted venation.

Flower and fruit 
The light purple flowers bloom from May to June; while the flower of Paulownia tomentosa has purple stripes, that of Paulownia coreana does not. The flower has five divided petals, each  in length. The tree bears light brown fruit from October to November; the fruits are elliptical, with sticky puffs.

Uses 
Since Korean paulownia is light, and easy to handle, it is considered good lumber. It can be used for making furniture, athletic goods and musical instruments. Specifically, the timber delivers sound well, so it is used to make the geomungo (Korean musical instrument with six strings), a type of mandolin, and the gayageum (twelve-string Korean zither). It also grows rapidly, so when cultivated, it helps prevent disease in plants. Its leaves are used as an insecticide, and its bark is used as natural dye. In addition, Paulownia coreana’s bark plays a great role in oriental medicine.

References 

Paulowniaceae
Plants described in 1925
Trees of Korea